Jabuticaba is the edible fruit of the jabuticabeira (Plinia cauliflora) or Brazilian grapetree. The purplish-black, white-pulped fruit grows directly on the trunk of the tree. It is eaten raw or used to make jellies, jams, juice or wine. The tree, of the family Myrtaceae, is native to the states of Rio de Janeiro, Minas Gerais, Goiás and São Paulo in Brazil. Related species in the genus Myrciaria, often referred to by the same common names, are native to Brazil, Argentina, Paraguay, Peru and Bolivia.

Etymology
The name jabuticaba, derived from the Tupi word îaboti Lusitanized jaboti/jabuti (tortoise) + kaba (place), meaning "the place where tortoises are found"; it has also been interpreted to mean 'like turtle fat', referring to the fruit's white pulp. It could also derive from ïapotï'kaba meaning "fruits in a bud".

The Guarani name is yvapurũ: yva means fruit and the onomatopoeic word purũ, from pururũ, describes the crunching sound the fruit produces when bitten.

Description

Plant
The tree is a slow-growing evergreen that can reach a height of 15 meters if not pruned. The leaves are salmon-pink when young, turning green as they mature.

The tree prefers moist, rich, lightly acidic soil. It is widely adaptable, however, and grows satisfactorily even on alkaline beach-sand type soils, so long as it is tended and irrigated. Its flowers are white and grow directly from its trunk in a cauliflorous habit. In its native habitat jaboticabeiras may flower and fruit 5-6 times throughout the year. Jabuticabeira are tropical to subtropical plants and can tolerate mild, brief frosts, not below 26 °F (-3 °C).

The tree has a compact, fibrous root system, that makes it suitable for growing in pots or transplanting.

Fruit
The fruit is a thick-skinned berry and typically measures 3–4 cm in diameter. The fruit resembles a slip-skin grape. It has a thick, purple, astringent skin that encases a sweet, white or rosy pink gelatinous flesh. Embedded within the flesh are one to four large seeds, which vary in shape depending on the species. Jabuticaba seeds are recalcitrant and they become unviable within 10 days when stored at room temperature.

In Brazil, the fruit of several related species, including Myrciaria tenella and Plinia peruviana, share the same common name.

Production and cultivation 
Jabuticaba has been cultivated in Brazil since pre-Columbian times. Today it is commercial crop in the center and south of the country.

Commercial cultivation of the fruit in the northern hemisphere is more restricted by slow growth and the short shelf-life of fruit than by temperature requirements. Grafted plants may bear fruit in five years, while seed-grown trees may take 10 to 20 years to bear fruit.

Jabuticabeiras are fairly adaptable to various kinds of growing conditions, tolerating sand or rich topsoil. They are intolerant of salty soils or salt spray. They are tolerant of mild drought, though fruit production may be reduced, and irrigation will be required in extended or severe droughts.

Jabuticabeiras are vulnerable to the rust, Austropuccinia psidii. particularly when the tree flowers during heavy rain. Other important diseases that affect jabuticabeiras are canker (Colletotrichum gloeosporioides), dieback (Rosellinia), and fruit rot (Botrytis cinerea).

Uses

Culinary 
Common in Brazilian markets, jabuticabas are largely eaten fresh. Fruit may begin to ferment 3 to 4 days after harvest, so it is often used to make jams, tarts, strong wines, and liqueurs. Due to the short shelf-life, fresh jabuticaba is rare in markets outside areas of cultivation.

The fruit has been compared to Muscadine grapes, and in Japan the flavor of jabuticaba has been described as similar to that of Kyoho grapes.

Bonsai 
Their slow growth and small size when immature make jabuticabeiras popular as bonsai or container ornamental plants in temperate regions. It is a widely used bonsai species in Taiwan and parts of the Caribbean.

Cultural significance 
The jabuticabeira appears as a charge on the coat of arms of Contagem, Minas Gerais, Brazil. 

In Brazilian politics, and less commonly in everyday speech, "jabuticaba" is a slang that describes a political or legal setting that is considered absurd, unusual, or needlessly complex, among others, that could only exist in a country like Brazil. It is a reference to the popular wisdom that jabuticaba trees can only grow in Brazil.

Related species 
There are a number of similar species of plant in the family Myrtaceae that produce fruit that is known by the common name Jabuticaba.

 Myrciaria glazioviana ( or yellow jabuticaba)
 Myrciaria tenella ( or soft jabuticaba)
 Plinia coronata ( or king jabuticaba)
 Plinia grandifolia ( or large jabuticaba)
 Plinia martinellii ( or little forest jabuticaba)
 Plinia oblongata ( or sour jabuticaba)
 Plinia peruviana ( or small stemmed jabuticaba)
 Plinia phitrantha ( or white jabuticaba)
 Plinia rivularis ( or bunched jabuticaba)
 Plinia spirito-santensis (hairy cross jaboticaba, or grimal in the United states).

References

External links

Jaboticaba California Rare Fruit Growers.

Plinia
Plants described in 1956
Plants used in bonsai
Crops originating from the Americas
Crops originating from Brazil
Tropical fruit
Flora of South America
Fruits originating in South America
Cauliflory
Crops originating from Peru
Fruit trees
Berries